Biplab Kumar Deb (born 25 November 1971) is an Indian politician who served as the Member of Rajya Sabha from Tripura since 2022.He also served as the 10th Chief Minister of Tripura from 2018 to 2022.He was the member of the Tripura Legislative Assembly from Banamalipur constituency from 2018 to 2022. He was also the President of the Bharatiya Janata Party,Tripura unit from 2016 to 2018.He is a member of Bharatiya Janata Party.

Early life 
Biplab Deb was born on 25 November 1971 in Rajdhar Nagar village, Udaipur, Gomati district, Tripura. His parents had migrated to India as refugees from Chandpur District, East Pakistan during liberation war in 1971 before his birth. His father is a citizen of India since 27 June 1967. He spent his childhood and schooling days in Tripura, completing his graduation from Tripura University before shifting to New Delhi. He later returned to Tripura after an absence of 15 years.

Political career 
Deb was elected the President of Tripura state unit of BJP in January 2017 replacing Sudhindra Dasgupta who was BJP's longest serving state president. He started his political career by campaigning for the 2018 state election. He began his campaign from the Tripura Tribal Areas Autonomous District Council which was believed to be the base of the then governing CPI(M).

On 8 August 2017 Biplab Deb helped bring about the defection of Indian National Congress MLAs led by Sudip Roy Barman to the Bharatiya Janata Party. He led the local BJP into the 2018 Legislative Assembly election, attempting to gain office after 25 years of Left Front rule.

Chief Minister 
Deb contested the election from Banamalipur Constituency in Agartala and won by a margin of 9,549 votes, which was held by Indian National Congress MLA Gopal Roy. Deb led the Tripura's Election campaign and defeated Left Front after 25 years by winning 44 seats with his ally Indigenous Peoples Front of Tripura out of possible 60 seats in Tripura.

Deb campaigned on the subject of youth employment opportunities, which he promised to improve if elected Chief Minister of Tripura. He also promised the employees of Tripura that he would implement the 7th Pay Commission once he got elected. Deb brought in key BJP ministers from across India to campaign for the party in Tripura.

He took his oath as the 10th Chief Minister of Tripura on 9 March 2018. He resigned from the post on 14 May 2022.

Controversies
In April 2018, Deb stirred nationwide controversy by claiming Internet existed during the times of the Mahabharata

He claimed that the oxygen levels will automatically rise in water bodies if ducks swim in them and wants every family to rear ducks and that his government plans to distribute 50,000 ducklings to villagers who lived near water bodies.

He also made controversial remarks on the Civil Service Examination, stating that only civil engineers should sit for civil service exams.

While addressing a function, Deb once again was surrounded in a controversy when he said Rabindranath Tagore returned his Nobel Prize in protest against the Jallianwala Bagh massacre.

In November 2019, Deb claimed, "The Mughals intended to bomb the culture of Tripura".

He also stated that international beauty pageants were a farce, and claimed that the decision to award Miss World and Miss Universe titles to Indian women for five years in a row was market-driven rather than based on the beauty of the participants while questioning the rationale behind awarding Diana Hayden the Miss World pageant.

In 2020, he claimed that Punjabis and Jats are physically strong but less intelligent than Bengalis.

See also
2018 Tripura Legislative Assembly election
Biplab Kumar Deb ministry

References

1969 births
Living people
20th-century Bengalis
21st-century Bengalis
Chief Ministers of Tripura
Bharatiya Janata Party politicians from Tripura
Tripura MLAs 2018–2023
Chief ministers from Bharatiya Janata Party
People from Gomati district
Tripura University alumni